Hackl is a German surname. Notable people with the surname include:

 Anton Hackl (1915–1984), German Luftwaffe pilot
 Zeno Otton Hackl (1912–1992), Bosnian and Croatian actor
 Christine Stix-Hackl (born 1957), Austrian jurist
 David Hackl, film director and production designer
 Erich Hackl (born 1954), Austrian novelist
 Georg Hackl (born 1966), German luger
 Karlheinz Hackl (born 1949), Austrian actor
 Raphael Hackl (born 1987), German rugby union international
 Madelyn Hackl (born 1997), American visual artist

See also
 Haeckel (disambiguation)
 Hackel

German-language surnames